Across the Indian subcontinent, the term gharjamai refers to a resident son-in-law who lives in a house of his wife's family

Etymology 
The word Gharjamai is a compound of two words : Ghar and Jamai. The word Ghar is derived from Sanskrit word Gr̥ha (गृह) meaning house and Jamai is derived from Sanskrit word jāmātr̥ (जामातृ) meaning son in law. Thus Gharjamai refers to resident son in law.

Definition 
A man who lives in a house of his wife is known as Gharjamai. He usually lives with his wife's family or depends on his wife's family for support. The term carries a social stigma in Indian society, as husband is traditionally considered responsible for running the household and depending on the wife's family for support is held in a negative view. In more modern usage, the overall financial position of the son-in-law is considered and taken into account when using this label; if, for example, the son-in-law possesses land or other property, he is not considered a Gharjamai. Varying definitions exist, however. Films and TV serials both with a serious and light hearted view have been made about this phenomenon.

In popular culture

Movies

TV Series

Books

References

Marriage in India
Marriage, unions and partnerships in Pakistan